Rodolfos Alexakos (born 12 May 1945) is a Greek sports shooter. He competed at the 1980 Summer Olympics and the 1984 Summer Olympics.

References

External links

1945 births
Living people
Greek male sport shooters
Olympic shooters of Greece
Shooters at the 1980 Summer Olympics
Shooters at the 1984 Summer Olympics
Place of birth missing (living people)
20th-century Greek people